The Cabildo was the seat of Spanish colonial city hall of New Orleans, Louisiana, and is now the Louisiana State Museum Cabildo. It is located along Jackson Square, adjacent to St. Louis Cathedral.

History 
The original Cabildo was destroyed in the Great New Orleans Fire (1788). The Cabildo was rebuilt between 1795–99 as the home of the Spanish municipal government in New Orleans, in 1821 Spanish coat of arms removed from the façade pediment and replaced with the extant American eagle with cannonballs by the Italian sculptor Pietro Cardelli and the third floor with mansard roof was later added in 1847, in French style. The building took its name from the governing body who met there—the "Illustrious Cabildo," or city council. The Cabildo was the site of the Louisiana Purchase transfer ceremonies late in 1803, and continued to be used by the New Orleans city council until the mid-1850s.

The building's main hall, the Sala Capitular ("Meeting Room"), was originally utilized as a courtroom. The Spanish used the courtroom from 1799 to 1803, and from 1803 to 1812 it was used by the Louisiana territorial superior court. During the years between 1868 and 1910, the Cabildo was the seat of the Louisiana Supreme Court. The Sala Capitular was the site of several landmark court cases, including Plessy v. Ferguson.

In 1895 the building was in a state of decay and proposed for demolition; artist William Woodward led a successful campaign to have the historic building preserved and restored. In 1911 (the state's highest court having vacated), the Cabildo became the home of the Louisiana State Museum. The museum displays exhibits about the history of Louisiana from its settlement up through the Reconstruction Era, and about the heritage of the ethnic groups who have lived in the state.

It was declared a National Historic Landmark in 1960.

The Cabildo was extensively damaged by a fire on May 11, 1988, which destroyed the cupola and the entire third floor, but it was restored and reopened to the public in 1994.

In 2005, the Cabildo survived Hurricane Katrina, the eye of which passed 30 miles (48 km) east of downtown, with relatively minor damage. Days after the storm struck, the Louisiana State Police used the business offices of the Cabildo to set up what was called Troop N. From the Cabildo, state troopers patrolled the city's streets along with police agencies from New Mexico and New York.

See also 
 Vieux Carré – the surrounding area
 Louisiana Purchase
 Louisiana State Museum
 The Presbytère, the twin of the Cabildo
 List of National Historic Landmarks in Louisiana
 National Register of Historic Places listings in Orleans Parish, Louisiana

Notes

External links

 The Cabildo on the Louisiana State Museum website
 The Cabildo: Two Centuries of Louisiana History at the Louisiana Dept. of Culture, Recreation & Tourism
 Friends of the Cabildo website

Cabildos
Pre-statehood history of Louisiana
Museums in New Orleans
History museums in Louisiana
French Quarter
Buildings and structures in New Orleans
Government buildings on the National Register of Historic Places in Louisiana
National Historic Landmarks in Louisiana
Government buildings completed in 1795
New Spain
Colonial United States (Spanish)
Spanish Colonial architecture in the United States
Louisiana State Museum
National Register of Historic Places in New Orleans
Individually listed contributing properties to historic districts on the National Register in Louisiana